Ivan Kurtović (born 29 June 1968) is a retired Croatian football defender. As a player, he spent five seasons with HNK Rijeka and four seasons with NK Zagreb in Croatia’s Prva HNL. He retired from football in 2003 after spending several seasons playing in Croatia’s lower divisions.

References

External links

1968 births
Living people
Sportspeople from Pula
Association football central defenders
Yugoslav footballers
Croatian footballers
HNK Rijeka players
NK Zagreb players
NK Istra players
NK Jadran Poreč players
Yugoslav First League players
Croatian Football League players